Ariceștii Rahtivani is a commune in Prahova County, Muntenia, Romania. It is composed of five villages: Ariceștii Rahtivani, Buda, Nedelea, Stoenești, and Târgșoru Nou.

Geography
The commune is situated in the Wallachian Plain, on the left bank of the Prahova River; the rivers Leaotul and Viișoara  flow through Târgșoru Nou village.

Transportation
The commune is crossed by national road , which runs from Ploiești to Târgoviște and on to Găești. In Stoenești village, two county roads branch off: DJ144, which leads north to Florești, and DJ140, which leads southeast to Târgșoru Vechi (where it intersects with DN1A), Brazi, and Puchenii Mari (where it ends in DN1).

Târgșor Prison
The Târgșor Prison is located on the western side of Târgșoru Nou. Built in 1857 for a monastery, the structure was taken over by the Romanian Army and turned into a military prison, which was also used for common law criminals when the nearby Ploiești Penitentiary was overcrowded. From 1948 to 1952, after the Communist system was established in Romania, this was the only prison for children in the world (dubbed the "Prison of Angels"). Hundreds of recalcitrant minors (some as young as 12) were subjected to psychological experiments and beaten with the intention of being "re-educated" in the spirit of the "Communist new man" (see: Re-education in Communist Romania); the re-education of minors was personally coordinated by Alexandru Nicolschi, one of the main organizers of the Pitești Experiment. Nowadays, the penitenciary serves as a women's prison.

References

Communes in Prahova County
Localities in Muntenia